The III African Roller Hockey Club Championship was the 3rd edition of the African Roller Hockey Club Championship organized by FARS. It was held in July 2010 in Pretoria, South Africa.

Was the first time from 15 years that Egypt had teams to participate.
 
The winner, of this tournament, Académica de Luanda, will be present in the most important Club Championship of Roller Hockey, Rink hockey World Club Championship to be held probably in Portugal or Egypt in 2010.

Teams

The clubs to participate in this Championship were:

Results
The Results of the Africa Cup were

Group A

Group B

Final four

Semifinals

Final 3rd and 4th

Final

Final Classification

References

External links

South African Roller Hockey Federation
Blog of Roller Hockey in Egypt
Mozambican Blog about the actuality of Roller Hockey

International
 Roller Hockey links worldwide
 Mundook-World Roller Hockey
Hardballhock-World Roller Hockey
Inforoller World Roller Hockey 
 World Roller Hockey Blog
rink-hockey-news – World Roller Hockey

S
2010 in roller hockey
Roller hockey in South Africa
Sports competitions in Pretoria
2010 in African sport
2010 in South African sport
African Roller Hockey Club Championship